A  or  (German, "coat of shame" or "barrel of shame"), sometimes also Spanish coat, is a torture device which came into use in the 13th century.  were fashioned from wood and sometimes lined with sheet metal. Victims were made to wear this device in public where they would be insulted, humiliated and have rotten vegetables thrown at them. The  was mostly used as punishment for poachers and prostitutes.

The  was weighted along the lower rim and around the neck opening as a way of corporal punishment in addition to the severe public humiliation it posed.

See also
Bankruptcy barrel
Drunkard's cloak

Further reading

Medieval instruments of torture
Modern instruments of torture
European instruments of torture
Physical restraint
German words and phrases